2MASS J04414489+2301513 (often abbreviated as 2M J044144) is a young star system hosting a planet and a couple of brown dwarfs, approximately 470 light years (145 parsecs) away.

The 2MASS J04414489+2301513 primary (a brown dwarf) has a large separation (12.4 arcseconds) companion, 2MASS J04414565+2301580 (abbreviated as 2M J044145), which in turn has a nearby small separation substellar companion (separation of 0.23 arcseconds to the northeast). 2M J044145 has similar proper motion to 2M J044144 and is likely physically associated with the system. The entire system of 4 objects is then a hierarchical quadruple of two binary stars orbiting each other. The primary component has a spectral type of M4.5 and a red apparent magnitude of 14.2. Both components seem to be accreting mass from their stellar disks, as shown by their emission lines. The four stars have a total mass of only 26% of the Sun, making it the quadruple star system with the lowest mass known.

Planetary system
The primary is orbited by a companion about 5–10 times the mass of Jupiter. The mass of the primary brown dwarf is roughly 20 times the mass of Jupiter and its age is roughly one million years. It is not clear whether this companion object is a sub-brown dwarf or a planet. The companion is very large with respect to its parent and must have formed within 1 million years or so. This seems to be too big and too fast to form like a regular planet from a disk around the central object.

See also
2MASS
2M1207
HR 8799

References

 

4
Brown dwarfs
Taurus (constellation)
J04414489+2301513
M-type brown dwarfs
Planetary systems with one confirmed planet
TIC objects